List of Missouri Civil War units may refer to:

 List of Missouri Confederate Civil War units
 List of Missouri Union Civil War units